Milesia tadzhikorum is a species of hoverfly in the family Syrphidae.

Distribution
Tadzhikistan.

References

Insects described in 1988
Eristalinae
Diptera of Asia